Timberscombe is a village and civil parish on the River Avill  south-west of Dunster, and  south of Minehead within the Exmoor National Park in Somerset, England. The parish includes the hamlet of Bickham.

History

The parish was part of the hundred of Carhampton.

Governance

The parish council has responsibility for local issues, including setting an annual precept (local rate) to cover the council's operating costs and producing annual accounts for public scrutiny. The parish council evaluates local planning applications and works with the local police, district council officers, and neighbourhood watch groups on matters of crime, security, and traffic. The parish council's role also includes initiating projects for the maintenance and repair of parish facilities, as well as consulting with the district council on the maintenance, repair, and improvement of highways, drainage, footpaths, public transport, and street cleaning. Conservation matters (including trees and listed buildings) and environmental issues are also the responsibility of the council.

The village falls within the non-metropolitan district of Somerset West and Taunton, which was established on 1 April 2019. It was previously in the district of West Somerset, which was formed on 1 April 1974 under the Local Government Act 1972, and part of Williton Rural District before that. The district council is responsible for local planning and building control, local roads, council housing, environmental health, markets and fairs, refuse collection and recycling, cemeteries and crematoria, leisure services, parks, and tourism.

Somerset County Council is responsible for running the largest and most expensive local services such as education, social services, libraries, main roads, public transport, policing and fire services, trading standards, waste disposal and strategic planning.

It is also part of the Bridgwater and West Somerset county constituency represented in the House of Commons of the Parliament of the United Kingdom. It elects one Member of Parliament (MP) by the first past the post system of election.

Geography

The 13 ha (33 acres) Bickham Wood, which is run as a nature reserve by the Somerset Wildlife Trust, comprises very wet, ancient, semi-natural woodland on the edge of the Brendon Hills Area of Outstanding Natural Beauty.

Landmarks

Timberscombe has many attractions including an Iron Age Fort, the lost village of Clicket and Cowbridge Sawmill, which has been restored as a working vintage sawmill . The village is a popular tourist area and provides ample bed and breakfast accommodation and holiday lets. The beautiful countryside makes it particularly popular with walkers, horse riders and cyclists.

Religious sites

The church is dedicated to Saint Petroc, who probably visited the parish in the 6th century. The church has a 15th-century tower, the rest of the building dating from 1708. It has been designated by English Heritage as a Grade I listed building.

Notable residents
 J. P. Martin (1879–1966) Methodist minister and children's author
 T.C. Lethbridge (1901-1971) Anglo-Saxon archaeologist lived as a child in Knowle House
Lord Justice Farwell - Sir George Farwell (1845 –1915) was an English judge, noted for trying the Taff Vale case at the first instance.

References

External links

Village website

Exmoor
Civil parishes in Somerset
Villages in West Somerset